Lancashire Holdings is a Bermuda-based insurance company operating in Bermuda and London. It is listed on the London Stock Exchange and is a constituent of the FTSE 250 Index.

History
The Company was initially launched on the Alternative Investment Market in November 2005. In February 2009 it secured a full listing on the London Stock Exchange. It acquired Cathedral Capital in 2013, gaining access to the Lloyd's insurance market.

Operations
The Company is focussed on property, energy, marine and aviation insurance. Unusually circa 85% of its business is primary insurance rather than re-insurance.

References

External links
Official site

Financial services companies established in 2005
Insurance companies of Bermuda
Companies listed on the London Stock Exchange